The 2002 Turkish Cup Final was a football match played on 3 April 2002 at the Bursa Atatürk Stadium in Bursa. It was the final and deciding match of the 2001–02 Turkish Cup.

Match details

References

 2002 Turkish Cup Final 

2002
Turkish Cup Final  2005